Graeme Morrison (born 17 October 1982 in Hong Kong) is a retired Scottish rugby union footballer. He played for Glasgow Warriors and Scotland as a Centre.

Rugby Union career

Amateur career

Morrison played as a schoolboy for, Dollar Academy, where he captained the first XV.

Professional career

He played for Glasgow Warriors for 10 years, making 176 appearances and 110 points.

On 20 May 2013, after a successful season for Glasgow, third in the Pro12 and Semi-finals of the play-offs, Graeme announced his retirement from rugby on medical advice, struggling with persistent knee problems.

International career

He has represented Scotland at under-21 level.

Morrison played in all four tests against Australia in 2004. He scored his first international try in the win over Japan at McDiarmid Park in the same year. Since then, he has gone on to win more than 30 test caps for Scotland.

He was recalled to the Scotland team for the first time in four years, for the Calcutta Cup tie against England on 8 March 2008, following some excellent displays for his club side, Glasgow Warriors.

References

External links
Glasgow profile
Scotland profile

1982 births
Living people
Rugby union centres
Glasgow Warriors players
People educated at Dollar Academy
Scotland international rugby union players
Hong Kong rugby union players
Scottish rugby union players